William White (1762–1811) was the second North Carolina Secretary of State, serving from 1798 until 1811.

White represented Lenoir County in the state legislature, first in the North Carolina House of Commons and then in the North Carolina Senate, from the county's creation in 1792 until the legislature appointed him Secretary of State in 1798.  The same year he built the White-Holman House, listed on the National Register of Historic Places in 1971.

He was served as Intendant of Police (mayor) of Raleigh from 1803-1806.

In 1811, White died in office. The legislature elected his former clerk, William Hill, to succeed him.

White's father-in-law was Governor Richard Caswell. White's daughter, Eleanor, married Governor David L. Swain in 1826.

References

External links
The Political Graveyard
North Carolina Manual of 1913

1762 births
1811 deaths
Members of the North Carolina House of Representatives
North Carolina state senators
Burials at City Cemetery (Raleigh, North Carolina)
Secretaries of State of North Carolina
Mayors of Raleigh, North Carolina